Justin Slayer (born Eugene Bell on September 10, 1972) is an American pornographic film actor and director. He is from Los Angeles, Ca.

He won the 2007 Adult Video News Awards "Best Ethnic Series - Latin" for the Mami Culo Grande series and "Best Ethnic Series - Black" for the Phatty Girls series.

He won the 2009 AVN awards, the Justin Slayer International film Mami Culo Grande 6 won "Best Ethnic-Themed Release - Latin".

In 2009, Slayer won the Urban X Award for Best Director Gonzo.

References

External links
 
 
 
 
 Foundry Music's Interview with Justin Slayer

American male pornographic film actors
African-American pornographic film actors
American pornographic film directors
Male actors from Los Angeles
Living people
Film directors from California
1972 births
21st-century African-American people
20th-century African-American people